This list of soft-skinned vehicles of the United States military is a list of soft-skinned vehicle models that have seen active service in the United States Armed Forces, including military trucks, motorcycles, side-by-sides and tractors.


Vehicles

See also
 List of land vehicles of the U.S. Armed Forces
 List of currently active United States military land vehicles
 List of United States Army tactical truck models
 List of vehicles of the United States Marine Corps

Notes

References

Citations

Bibliography
 
 
 
 
 
 
 
 
 
 
 
 
 
 
 

Military trucks of the United States
Military vehicles of the United States